This is a list of awards named after Governors General of Canada. It has become a tradition for governors general to establish a trophy, grant, scholarship, or other award in sport, the arts, academia, or professional fields, either during their tenure or just prior to their departure from the office. Viceregal consorts may also create awards, such as the Lady Byng Memorial Trophy, named for Evelyn Byng, Viscountess Byng of Vimy; these, however, are not included in this list.

Awards in sports

Awards in arts and academia

See also
 List of awards presented by the Governor General of Canada
 Viceregal eponyms in Canada
 Connaught Cup (disambiguation), several named after the Duke of Connaught
 Dufferin Medal

References

Awards named after Governors General of Canada
Governors General of Canada, named
Awards named after Governors General of Canada